Assailant is an upcoming thriller film written and directed by Tom Paton. It stars Poppy Delevingne, Chad Michael Collins, Casper Van Dien, and Jeff Fahey. The film is scheduled to be released by Redbox Entertainment in 2022.

Premise
A couple going through marriage counseling decides to head to the Caribbean on a "make or break" sailing holiday. When the husband gets into a local bar fight the night before a difficult trek over a coastal trail, the duo finds themselves relentlessly chased by the aggressor and forced to work together in order to survive.

Cast

Production
Principal photography for Assailant began on April 15, 2021, in the Federation of Saint Christopher and Nevis. On May 7, the project was officially announced, when it was reported that Poppy Delevingne, Chad Michael Collins, Casper Van Dien, and Jeff Fahey would star. Filming was scheduled to conclude on May 16, 2021. Following One Year Off, the feature is the second of six films to be shot in Saint Christopher and Nevis under a deal between the production company MSR Media and the Nevis Island Administration. In July 2021, a first-look clip was released. In November 2021, Redbox Entertainment acquired the distribution rights to the film for a 2022 release.

References

External links
 

Upcoming films
American thriller films
Upcoming English-language films